John Gage was a partner at Kleiner Perkins and the former Vice President of the Science Office at Sun Microsystems.

John or Jack Gage may also refer to:

Politicians and landowners
 John B. Gage (1887–1970), mayor of Kansas City, Missouri, 1940–1946
 Sir John Gage (15th-century landowner) (died 1475)
 Sir John Gage (Tudor politician) (1479–1556), English Tudor politician
John Gage (died 1598), MP for Lewes
 Sir John Gage, 1st Baronet (died 1633), English baronet and landowner
 Jack R. Gage (1899–1970), American politician

Others
 John Gage (Indecent Proposal), fictional character in the film Indecent Proposal
 Firefighter Paramedic John Gage, fictional character in the American television series Emergency!
 Jack Gage (director) (1912–1989), American film and television director
 John Gage (art historian) (1938–2012), British art historian

See also
 John Gage Rokewode (1786–1842), British historian and antiquarian
 John Gager (born 1937), professor of religion at Princeton University